Clemente de Faria Jr. (born August 17, 1987 in Belo Horizonte) is a Brazilian racing driver. He won the 2007 Formula Three Sudamericana championship with the Cesário Formula team, and was part of A1 Team Brazil as a rookie driver, during the 2007-08 A1 Grand Prix season. He would make appearances in the rookie sessions, at Taupo Motorsport Park in New Zealand and at Eastern Creek Raceway in Australia. He moved up to the British Formula Three Championship during the 2008 season, driving at Silverstone for Räikkönen Robertson Racing and at Donington Park with his Sudamericana-winning Cesário Formula team.

From 2010 onwards Clemente went back to Brazil and joined Pater Racing for Trofeo Linea Brasil.

Racing record

Career summary

References

External links 

1987 births
Living people
Brazilian racing drivers
British Formula Three Championship drivers
Formula 3 Sudamericana drivers
Sportspeople from Belo Horizonte
Double R Racing drivers